Henderson Ricardo "Hendy" Bryan (born  17 March 1970) is a former Barbadian cricketer, who played for West Indies as an all rounder in 15 One Day Internationals.

International career
In his ODI debut, he was dismissed for a 'duck' against Australia at Kingstown. However, he had his career best ODI figure of 10-1-24-4 in that match which earned him the Man of the Match Award. He represented West Indies in the 1999 Cricket World Cup.

Domestic career
He also played domestic cricket for Barbados and Griqualand West.

References

External links
Cricket Archive profile

1970 births
Living people
Barbadian cricketers
West Indies One Day International cricketers
Barbados cricketers
Griqualand West cricketers
Commonwealth Games competitors for Barbados
Cricketers at the 1998 Commonwealth Games
Cricketers at the 1999 Cricket World Cup
People from Saint Lucy, Barbados